Sympistis insanina is a moth of the family Noctuidae first described by James T. Troubridge in 2008. It is found in Canada from Alberta and southern Saskatchewan.

The wingspan is 33–35 mm.

References

insanina
Moths described in 2008